was a Japanese businessman. He served as the president and later honorary chairman of Nisshin Seifun Group, the country's largest flour milling company. He was the father of Empress Michiko and the maternal grandfather of Emperor Naruhito. The Shōda family is prominent in both industrial and academic circles.

References

1903 births
1999 deaths
Japanese businesspeople
Japanese nobility